Campbells River, a perennial stream that is part of the Upper Macquarie catchment within the Murray–Darling basin, is located in the central–western region of New South Wales, Australia.

The river is impounded by Ben Chifley Dam upstream of Bathurst and carries water released from the dam for Bathurst's potable water supply.

See also
 List of rivers of Australia

References

Rivers of New South Wales
Murray-Darling basin